The first predecessor of the 914th Expeditionary Air Refueling Squadron was organized in 1942 as the 8th Observation Squadron.  It trained in the United States during World War II as a reconnaissance unit and then provided target support for antiaircraft units until being disbanded in 1944 during a general reorganization of Army Air Forces units in the United States.  It was reactivated and deployed to the South West Pacific Theater of World War II and was inactivated in the Philippines in February 1946.

The 914th Air Refueling Squadron was activated by the United States Air Force in 1961 at Blytheville Air Force Base, Arkansas, where it was assigned to the 97th Bombardment Wing.  The squadron flew Boeing KC-135 Stratotanker aircraft to support the Strategic Air Command. It was inactivated in 1964, when its mission, personnel and equipment were transferred to the 97th Air Refueling Squadron.

The two squadrons were consolidated in September 1985 but the consolidated squadron was not activated.  In 2003 it was redesignated the 914th Expeditionary Air Refueling Squadron, converted to provisional status, and assigned to Air Mobility Command to activate or inactivate as needed.

History

World War II

The first predecessor of the squadron was activated as the 8th Observation Squadron at Pope Field, North Carolina in February 1942. Two months after activating, it moved to Langley Field, Virginia.  Although the squadron was equipped with a variety of aircraft, at Langley it flew primarily Martin B-10 and North American O-47 aircraft. At Langley the unit began the target towing mission in addition to the artillery spotting mission of an observation squadron. The squadron moved to Camp Davis Army Air Field, North Carolina a month later and by the end of the year was redesignated the 14th Tow Target Squadron. While at Camp Davis the squadron was assigned several Women Airforce Service Pilots.

However, by 1944 the Army Air Forces found that standard military units, based on relatively inflexible tables of organization, were proving less well adapted to the training mission.  Accordingly, it adopted a more functional system in which each base was organized into a separate numbered unit, while the groups and squadrons acting as training units were disbanded or inactivated. This resulted in the 14th, along with other units at Camp Davis, being disbanded in the spring of 1944 and being replaced by an AAF Base Unit which absorbed the squadron's mission, personnel, and equipment.

The squadron was reconstituted in the fall of 1944 at McChord Field, Washington and equipped with North American B-25 Mitchell bombers modified to serve as target tugs. Its personnel moved to Camp Stoneman, California in November and shipped out to the Pacific Theater of Operations on 12 December. It arrived on Biak, an island north of New Guinea, on 6 January 1945, then moved to Nadzab Airfield on the main island, where it began towing targets for artillery and air-to-air gunnery training. The squadron moved to Clark Field on Luzon in the Philippines, where it continued its mission until December 1945. It was inactivated on 1 February 1946.

Cold War
The 914th Air Refueling Squadron was organized in October 1961 by Strategic Air Command (SAC) at Blytheville Air Force Base, Arkansas.  The squadron was equipped with Boeing KC-135 Stratotankers and assigned to the 97th Bombardment Wing as part of SAC's plan to disperse its Boeing B-52 Stratofortress units to make it more difficult for the Soviet Union to destroy the entire fleet with a first strike. The squadron's mission was to provide air refueling to the B-52s of its parent wing and other USAF units as directed.  One-third of the squadron's aircraft were maintained on fifteen-minute alert, fully fueled and ready for combat to reduce vulnerability to a Soviet missile strike.  This was increased to half the squadron's aircraft in 1962. The squadron trained for this mission until inactivation.

The 14th Tow Target Squadron was consolidated with the 914th Air Refueling Squadron in September 1985 but the consolidated squadron has not been active since.

On 27 March 2003 the squadron was converted to provisional status as the 914th Expeditionary Air Refueling Squadron and assigned to Air Mobility Command to activate or inactivate as needed for contingency operations.

Lineage
14th Tow Target Squadron
 Constituted as the 8th Observation Squadron (Special) on 28 January 1942
 Activated on 3 February 1942
 Redesignated the 14th Tow Target Squadron on 12 December 1942
 Disbanded on 10 April 1944
 Reconstituted on 26 September 1944
 Activated on 6 October 1944
 Inactivated on 1 February 1946
 Consolidated with the 914th Air Refueling Squadron as the 914th Air Refueling Squadron on 19 September 1985

914th Air Refueling Squadron
 Constituted as the 914th Air Refueling Squadron, Heavy on 17 May 1961 and activated (not organized)
 Organized on 1 October 1961
 Discontinued and inactivated on 23 October 1964
 Consolidated with the 14th Tow Target Squadron on 19 September 1985 (remained inactive)
 Redesignated 914th Expeditionary Air Refueling Squadron and converted to provisional status on 27 March 2003

Assignments

 Office of the Chief of Air Corps, 3 February 1942
 Third Air Force, 12 December 1942
 I Air Support Command (later I Tactical Air Division), 17 December 1942
 First Air Force, 4 November 1943 – 1 April 1944
 Fourth Air Force, 6 October 1944
 360th Service Group, c. 9 January 1945
 XIII Bomber Command, c. November 1945
 Thirteenth Air Force, 27 December 1945 – 1 February 1946
 97th Bombardment Wing, 1 October 1961 – 23 October 1964

Stations

 Pope Field, North Carolina, 3 February 1942
 Langley Field, Virginia, 4 April 1942
 Camp Davis Army Air Field, North Carolina, 8 May 1942 – 10 April 1944
 McChord Field, Washington, 6 October 1944 – 17 November 1944
 Nadzab Airfield, New Guinea (now West Papua), 9 January 1945
 Clark Field, Luzon, Philippines, c. 17 July 1945 – 1 February 1946
 Blytheville Air Force Base, Arkansas, 1 October 1961 – 23 October 1964

Aircraft

 Douglas A-20 and P-70 Havoc, 1945
 Douglas A-24 Banshee, 1942–1944
 Martin B-10, 1942–1944
 North American B-25 Mitchell, 1945
 Lockheed B-34 Lexington, 1942–1944
 Stinson L-1 Vigilant, 1942–1944
 Piper L-4 Grasshopper, 1942–1944
 North American O-47, 1942–1944
 O-52, 1942–1944
 Republic P-47 Thunderbolt, 1942–1944
 Boeing KC-135A Stratotanker, 1961–1964

Awards and Campaigns

See also
 List of United States Air Force reconnaissance squadrons
 List of United States Air Force air refueling squadrons
 List of A-20 Havoc operators

References

Notes
Explanatory Notes

Footnotes

Bibliography

Further reading
 

Air refueling squadrons of the United States Air Force